A Fistful of Fingers is a 1995 British Western comedy film about a cowboy who follows a wanted man who caused the death of his horse Easy. It was written and directed by Edgar Wright in his feature-length directorial debut.

Cast
Graham Low as No-Name
Oli van der Vijver as The Squint
Nicola Stapleton as Floozy
Martin Curtis as Running Sore
Jeremy Beadle as himself
Neil Mullarkey as Stand Up Comedian
Dan Palmer as "Pile-On" Kid
Mark Sheffield as Calamity Keith
Edgar Wright as Cheesy Voiceover Artist/Two Bit Farmer Cameo
Quentin Green as Jimmy James
Toby Kendrick as Outlaw

Release
It opened at the Prince Charles Cinema on 24 November 1995, and debuted in the United States 20 years later at the Cinefamily in Los Angeles as a midnight movie.

The film was never commercially available on home video in either country, although Wright said in 2015 that he hoped to "finally release it [...] with a commentary and everything".

Reception
Derek Elley of Variety said the film showed, "more wit and invention than most of its no-budget Brit saddlemates." Time Out said, "Wright may not be in the class of Robert Rodriguez, but he has talent", and said the film was, "Best seen after a couple of beers." Nick Allen of RogerEbert.com called it, "...delightfully dorky, irreverent and scrappy, the exact kind of project a young filmmaker would make if they just wanted to make fellow nerds laugh and were pretty good at doing so." Ethan Anderton of SlashFilm said, "What makes [the film] so delightful is that it's a spaghetti western send-up that respects the genre as much as it makes fun of it." Stark of Pornokitsch said, "As a Western, it's good fun, and as a debut, it's a hell of an effort." Ramsey Ess of Vulture said, "While [the film is] missing many of the trademark editorial flourishes and camera tricks that would be adopted by the time Shaun of the Dead came around, it's still a well-constructed, quickly paced piece of work."

References

External links

1995 films
British parody films
Films directed by Edgar Wright
Films with screenplays by Edgar Wright
1990s parody films
British Western (genre) comedy films
1990s Western (genre) comedy films
Western (genre) film remakes
1995 directorial debut films
1995 comedy films
1990s English-language films
1990s British films